Laizhou Bay is a bay on the southern shore of the Bohai Sea (also known as the Bohai Gulf, or just Bo Hai, which is a large and relatively shallow westward extension of the northern Yellow Sea), bounded by the northwestern coastline of the Shandong Peninsula west of the Port of Longkou and the eastern coastline of Dongying south of the Yellow River estuary.  It is named after the county-level city of Laizhou to its east, and is the smallest of the three main bays of the Bohai Sea (the other two being the Liaodong Bay to the north, and the Bohai Bay to the west).

See also
 Laizhou

References
Tom McKnight, PhD, et al.; Geographica (ATLAS), 1999–2004, 3rd revision, Barnes and Noble Books AND Random House, New York, 618 pp.

Laizhou Bay
Bohai Sea